Réjean Savoie (born September 15, 1952) is a businessman and political figure in New Brunswick. He is the Progressive Conservative Party MLA for Miramichi Bay-Neguac since 2022 in a by-election to replace Lisa Harris, having previously represented Miramichi Bay in the Legislative Assembly of New Brunswick from 1999 to 2003.

He was born in Saint-Wilfred, New Brunswick, the son of Levi
Savoie and Exéline Roy. Savoie studied at the Bathurst Technical School and the New Brunswick Community College. He worked as a tractor trailer operator and also owned and operated a restaurant and service station. Savoie served as a member of the school board and as a member of the board of directors for the Neguac Medical Clinic and the l’Hotel-Dieu Hospital in Chatham.

He returned to office after winning the June 2022 by-election in Miramichi Bay-Neguac.

References 

 New Brunswick MLAs, New Brunswick Legislative Library (pdf)

1952 births
Acadian people
Progressive Conservative Party of New Brunswick MLAs
Living people
21st-century Canadian politicians